A number of Greek letters, variants, digits, and other symbols are supported by the Unicode character encoding standard.

Blocks
As of version 15.0 of the Unicode Standard, 518 characters in the following blocks are classified as belonging to the Greek script:
 Greek and Coptic: U+0370–U+03FF (117 characters)
 Phonetic Extensions: U+1D00–U+1D7F (15 characters)
 Phonetic Extensions Supplement: U+1D80–U+1DBF
 Greek Extended: U+1F00–U+1FFF (233 characters)
 Letterlike Symbols: U+2100–U+214F
 Latin Extended-E: U+AB30–U+AB6F
 Ancient Greek Numbers: U+10140–U+1018F (79 characters)
 Ancient Symbols: U+10190–U+101CF
 Ancient Greek Musical Notation: U+1D200–U+1D24F (70 characters)

List
The following is a Unicode collation algorithm list of Greek characters and those Greek-derived characters that are sorted alongside them.

Most of the characters of the blocks listed above are included, except for the Ancient Greek Numbers, Ancient Symbols and Ancient Greek Musical Notation. In addition, the collation charts include Greek-derived characters from the following blocks:

 Latin-1 Supplement: U+0080–U+00FF
 CJK Compatibility: U+3300–U+33FF (8 characters)
 Mathematical Alphanumeric Symbols: U+1D400–U+1D7FF (282 characters)

References  

Unicode